This article serves as an index - as complete as possible - of all the honorific orders or similar decorations received by the Danish Royal Family, classified by continent, awarding country and recipient.

Danish honours 
 HM The Queen: 
 Knight of the Order of the Elephant (20 April 1947)
 Grand Commander of the Order of Dannebrog (14 January 1972)
 HRH The Crown Prince: 
 Knight of the Order of the Elephant (14 January 1972) 
 Grand Commander of the Order of the Dannebrog (1 January 2004)
 HRH The Crown Princess:
 Knight of the Order of the Elephant (9 May 2004)
 HRH Prince Joachim: 
 Knight of the Order of the Elephant (14 January 1972) 
 Grand Commander of the Order of the Dannebrog (16 April 2004) 
 HRH Princess Marie:
 Knight of the Order of the Elephant (24 May 2008)
 HRH Princess Benedikte: 
 Knight of the Order of the Elephant (20 April 1947) 
 Grand Commander of the Order of the Dannebrog (27 January 1993)
 HM Queen Anne-Marie of the Hellenes (born Princess of Denmark):
  Knight of the Order of the Elephant (20 April 1947)
 HE The Countess of Frederiksborg (former Princess of Denmark): Knight of the Order of the Elephant (17 November 1995)
 HE Count Ingolf of Rosenborg (former Prince of Denmark): Knight of the Order of the Elephant (17 February 1961)

European foreign honours

Austria
 Queen Margrethe II: Grand Star of the Decoration for Services to the Republic of Austria

Belgium

 Queen Margrethe II: Grand Cordon of the Order of Leopold
 Crown Prince Frederik: Grand Cordon of the Order of Leopold
 Crown Princess Mary: Grand Cross of the Order of the Crown
 Prince Joachim: Grand Cross of the Order of the Crown
 Princess Marie: Grand Cross of the Order of Leopold II
 Princess Benedikte: Grand Cross of the Order of the Crown

Bulgaria

 Queen Margrethe II: Grand Cross of the Order of the Stara Planina
 Crown Prince Frederik: Member 1st Class of the Order of Stara Planina
 Crown Princess Mary: Member 1st Class of the Order of Stara Planina
 Prince Joachim: Member 1st Class of the Order of Stara Planina

Croatia
 Queen Margrethe II: Member of the Grand Order of King Tomislav

Estonia
 Queen Margrethe II: Collar of the Order of the Cross of Terra Mariana
 Crown Prince Frederik: Member 1st Class of the Order of the Cross of Terra Mariana

Finland

 Queen Margrethe II:  Commander Grand Cross with Collar of the Order of the White Rose
 Crown Prince Frederik:  Commander Grand Cross of the Order of the White Rose of Finland
 Crown Princess Mary:  Commander Grand Cross of the Order of the White Rose of Finland
 Prince Joachim:  Commander Grand Cross of the Order of the White Rose of Finland
 Princess Marie:  Commander Grand Cross of the Order of the White Rose of Finland
 Princess Benedikte:  Commander Grand Cross of the Order of the White Rose of Finland
 Alexandra, Countess of Frederiksborg:  Commander Grand Cross of the Order of the White Rose of Finland

France

 Queen Margrethe II: Grand Cross of the Order of the Legion of Honour
 Crown Prince Frederik: Grand Cross of the National Order of Merit
 Crown Princess Mary: Grand Cross of the National Order of Merit
 Prince Joachim: Grand Officer of the Order of the Legion of Honour
 Princess Marie: Grand Officer of the Order of the Legion of Honour

Germany

 Queen Margrethe II: Grand Cross Special Class of the Order of Merit of the Federal Republic of Germany
 Crown Prince Frederik: Grand Cross 1st Class of the Order of Merit of the Federal Republic of Germany
 Prince Joachim: Grand Cross 1st Class of the Order of Merit of the Federal Republic of Germany
 Princess Benedikte: Grand Cross 1st Class of the Order of Merit of the Federal Republic of Germany

Greece

Greek Royal Family

 Queen Margrethe II: Dame Grand Cross of the Order of Saints Olga and Sophia
 Princess Benedikte: Dame Grand Cross of the Order of Saints Olga and Sophia
 Queen Anne-Marie:
 Knight Grand Cross of the Royal Order of the Redeemer
 Grand Mistress Dame Grand Cross of the Order of Saints Olga and Sophia

Greek Republic

 Queen Margrethe II: Grand Cross of the Order of the Redeemer
 Crown Prince Frederik: Grand Cross of the Order of Honour
 Crown Princess Mary: Grand Cross of the Order of Beneficence
 Prince Joachim: Grand Cross of the Order of the Phoenix
 Princess Marie: Grand Cross of the Order of Beneficence

Iceland
 Queen Margrethe II: Collar with Grand Cross Breast Star (1973) of the Order of the Falcon
 Crown Prince Frederik: Grand Cross of the Order of the Falcon
 Crown Princess Mary: Grand Cross of the Order of the Falcon
 Prince Joachim: Grand Cross of the Order of the Falcon
 Princess Marie: Grand Cross of the Order of the Falcon
 Princess Benedikte: Grand Cross of the Order of the Falcon

Italy

 Queen Margrethe II: Knight Grand Cross with Collar of the Order of Merit of the Italian Republic
 Crown Prince Frederik: Knight Grand Cross of the Order of Merit of the Italian Republic
 Princess Benedikte: Knight Grand Cross of the Order of Merit of the Italian Republic

Holy See
 Princess Benedikte: Recipient of the For Church and Pope Badge Medal

Castroan Royal Family of Two Sicilies
 Princess Benedikte: Dame Grand Cross of the Royal Order of Francis I

Latvia
 Queen Margrethe II:  Commander Grand Cross with Chain of the Order of the Three Stars
 Crown Prince Frederik:  Commander Grand Cross of the Order of the Three Stars

Lithuania
 Queen Margrethe II: Recipient of the Order of Vytautas the Great with the Golden Chain

Luxembourg

 Queen Margrethe II: Knight of the Order of the Gold Lion of the House of Nassau
 Crown Prince Frederik: Grand Cross of the Order of Adolphe of Nassau
 Prince Joachim:  Grand Cross of the Order of Adolphe of Nassau
 Princess Benedikte: Grand Cross of the Order of Adolphe of Nassau
 Alexandra, Countess of Frederiksborg: Grand Cross of the Order of Adolphe of Nassau

Monaco
 Princess Benedikte: Grand Officer of the Order of the Crown

Netherlands

 Queen Margrethe II: Knight Grand Cross of the Order of the Netherlands Lion
 Crown Prince Frederik:
 Knight Grand Cross of the Order of the Netherlands Lion
 Recipient of the King Willem-Alexander Inauguration Medal
 Crown Princess Mary: 
 Knight Grand Cross of the Order of the Netherlands Lion
 Recipient of the King Willem-Alexander Inauguration Medal
 Prince Joachim: Grand Cross of the Order of the Crown
 Princess Marie: Grand Cross of the Order of the Crown
 Princess Benedikte: Grand Cross of the Order of the Crown

Norway
 Queen Margrethe II: Grand Cross with Collar of the Order of St. Olav
 Crown Prince Frederik: Grand Cross of the Order of St. Olav
 Crown Princess Mary: Grand Cross of the Order of St. Olav
 Prince Joachim: Grand Cross of the Order of St. Olav
 Princess Marie: Grand Cross of the Order of St. Olav
 Princess Benedikte: Grand Cross of the Order of St. Olav

Poland

 Queen Margrethe II: 
 Grand Cross of the Order of the White Eagle
 Grand Cross of the Order of Merit of the Republic of Poland

Portugal

 Queen Margrethe II: 
 Grand Collar of the Military Order of Saint James of the Sword
 Grand Collar of the Order of Prince Henry

Romania

 Queen Margrethe II: Collar of the Order of the Star of Romania
 Crown Prince Frederik: Grand Cross of the Order of the Star of Romania
 Prince Joachim: Grand Cross of the Order of the Star of Romania
 Alexandra, Countess of Frederiksborg: Grand Cross of the Order of the Star of Romania

Slovakia
 Queen Margrethe II: Grand Cross of the Order of the White Double Cross

Slovenia
 Queen Margrethe II: Recipient of the Golden Order of Freedom of the Republic of Slovenia

Spain
 Queen Margrethe II:
 Dame of the Order of the Golden Fleece
 Dame Collar of the Order of Charles III
 Princess Benedikte: Dame Grand Cross of the Order of Isabella the Catholic

Sweden

 Queen Margrethe II: 
 Member of the Order of the Seraphim
 Recipient of the 85th Birthday Badge Medal of King Gustaf VI Adolf
 Recipient of the 50th Birthday Badge Medal of King Carl XVI Gustaf
 Recipient of the Ruby Jubilee Badge Medal of King Carl XVI Gustaf
 Recipient of the 70th Birthday Badge Medal of King Carl XVI Gustaf
 Crown Prince Frederik:
Knight of the Order of the Seraphim
 Recipient of the 70th Birthday Badge Medal of King Carl XVI Gustaf
 Crown Princess Mary:
 Commander Grand Cross of the Order of the Polar Star
 Recipient of the 70th Birthday Badge Medal of King Carl XVI Gustaf
 Prince Joachim:
Commander Grand Cross of the Order of the Polar Star
 Princess Benedikte:
 Commander Grand Cross of the Order of the Polar Star
 Recipient of the 85th Birthday Badge Medal of King Gustaf VI Adolf
 Recipient of the 50th Birthday Badge Medal of King Carl XVI Gustaf
 Recipient of the Ruby Jubilee Badge Medal of King Carl XVI Gustaf
 Queen Anne-Marie: 
 Recipient of the 85th Birthday Badge Medal of King Gustaf VI Adolf
 Recipient of the 50th Birthday Badge Medal of King Carl XVI Gustaf

United Kingdom
 Queen Margrethe II:
 Stranger Lady of the Order of the Garter (7th Lady since 1901; 1979)
 Recipient of the Royal Victorian Chain (1974)

Yugoslavia
 Queen Margrethe II: Great Star of the Order of the Yugoslav Star

American foreign honours

Argentina 
 Margrethe II of Denmark : Grand Cross of the Order of the Liberator San Martin
 Princess Benedikte of Denmark : Grand Cross of Order of the Liberator General San Martin

Brazil 
 Margrethe II of Denmark : Grand Collar of the Order of the Southern Cross
 Frederik, Crown Prince of Denmark :
 Grand Cross of the Order of the Southern Cross
 Grand Cross of the Order of Rio Branco
 Mary, Crown Princess of Denmark : Grand Cross of the Order of the Southern Cross (2007)
 Prince Joachim of Denmark : Grand Cross of the Order of the Southern Cross (2007)

Chile 
 Margrethe II of Denmark : Grand Cross of the Order of the Merit of Chile
 Frederik, Crown Prince of Denmark: Grand Cross of the Order of Merit of Chile

Mexico 
 Margrethe II of Denmark : Collar of the Order of the Aztec Eagle (2008)
 Frederick, Crown Prince of Denmark: Sash of Special Category of the Order of the Aztec Eagle
 Mary, Crown Princess of Denmark: Sash of the Order of the Aztec Eagle
 Prince Joachim of Denmark: Sash of the Order of the Aztec Eagle
 Princess Marie of Denmark: Sash of the Order of the Aztec Eagle
 Princess Benedikte of Denmark: Sash of the Order of the Aztec Eagle

African foreign honours

Egypt 
 Margrethe II of Denmark : Collar of the Order of the Nile

Morocco 
 Margrethe II of Denmark : Grand Cordon of the Order of Ouissam Alaouite

South Africa 
 Margrethe II of Denmark : Grand Collar of the Order of Good Hope

Tunisia 
 Princess Benedikte of Denmark : Grand Officer of the Order of the Republic (Tunisia)

Asian foreign honours

Iranian Imperial Family
 Queen Margrethe II: Dame 1st Class of the Order of the Pleiades

Japan

 Queen Margrethe II:
 Collar of the Order of the Chrysanthemum
 Grand Cordon (Paulownia) of the Order of the Precious Crown
 Crown Prince Frederik: Grand Cordon of the Order of the Chrysanthemum
 Prince Joachim: Grand Cordon of the Order of the Chrysanthemum

Jordan

 Queen Margrethe II: Grand Cordon of the Order of al-Hussein bin Ali
 Crown Prince Frederik: Grand Cordon of the Supreme Order of the Renaissance
 Prince Joachim: Grand Cordon of the Supreme Order of the Renaissance

Nepalese Royal Family

 Queen Margrethe II: 
 Member of the Mahendra Chain
 Member of the Order of Honour
 Crown Prince Frederik: Member Grand Cross of the Order of Ojaswi Rajanya
 Prince Joachim: Member 1st Class of the Order of the Three Divine Powers

Saudi Arabia
 Queen Margrethe II: Collar of the Order of Abdul Aziz Al Saud

South Korea
 Queen Margrethe II: Recipient of the Grand Order of Mugunghwa

Thailand
 Queen Margrethe II:
 Dame of the Order of the Rajamitrabhorn
 Dame of the Order of the Royal House of Chakri
 Crown Prince Frederik: Knight Grand Cross of the Order of Chula Chom Klao

United Arab Emirates
 Queen Margrethe II: Grand Cordon of the Order of Al Kamal

References

Danish monarchy
 
Denmark